ट or YOK may refer to:

Yok weaving technique, see Tstyle dresses
Yok, a Turkish copula, negation of "to be"
YOK or YÖK, an abbreviation for the Commission for Higher Education, Turkey
yok, the ISO 639-3 code for the Yokuts language spoken by the Yokuts people of California, US
YOK, the National Rail code for Yoker railway station, Scotland, UK

See also
Sai Yok (disambiguation)
Yok-Utian languages